Thomas Savage, 1st Viscount Savage, 2nd Baronet ( 1586 – 20 November 1635), was an English peer and courtier in the reign of Charles I.

Early life
Savage was the eldest son of Sir John Savage (1554 – 1615), 1st Baronet, of Rocksavage in Cheshire and Mary (d. 1635), daughter of Richard Allington. He succeeded his father as 2nd Baronet 7 July 1615.

Career
In 1616 Savage served as Deputy Lieutenant of Cheshire and was knighted 29 June 1617, in Edinburgh. He was made Steward of the borough of Congleton in January 1625; First Commissioner of Trade in 1626; Commissioner to advise as to ways and means of increasing the King's revenue in July 1626, and for the sale of the King's lands, 15 September in the same year. On 4 November 1626 he was created Viscount Savage. He was appointed Chancellor to the Queen Consort in 1628 and her Councillor in 1634. He was also Ranger of Delamere Forest in Cheshire.

Marriage and issue
He married Elizabeth, daughter of Thomas Darcy, 1st Earl Rivers and Mary Kitson, on 14 May 1602. The couple had eleven sons and eight daughters:
 John Savage, 2nd Earl Rivers (1603 – 1654), married firstly, Catherine, daughter of William Parker, 13th Baron Morley and secondly, Mary, daughter of Thomas Ogle.
 Thomas Savage, married Bridget, widow of Sir Edward Somerset, son of Edward Somerset, 4th Earl of Worcester, daughter of William Whitmore by Margaret Beeston, and great-great-granddaughter of Thomas Cromwell, 1st earl of Essex.
 Francis Savage (bef. 1609 – )
 William Savage (1619 – )
 James Savage (1609 – 1638)
 Richard Savage, baptised in 1622.
 Charles Savage (c. 1622– ), married and had a daughter:
 Mary Savage, married Jeremy Thoresby, son of John Thoresby of Leeds and younger brother of the antiquarian, Ralph Thoresby.
 Jane Savage (c. 1604 – bef. 16 April 1631), married after 18 December 1622, as his first wife, John Paulet, 5th Marquess of Winchester.
 Dorothy Savage (c. 1611 – 6 December 1691), married 10 April 1637, Charles Howard, 2nd Earl of Berkshire.
 Elizabeth Savage (c. 1612– ), married Sir John Thimbleby (1603 – 1661), of Irnham, Lincolnshire.
 Anne Savage (1617 – 16 June 1696), married in 1661, as his second wife, Robert Brudenell, 2nd Earl of Cardigan.
 Catherine Savage, a nun at Dunkirk.
 Henrietta Maria Savage (c. 1621 – 1663), married, in 1645, Ralph Sheldon, of Beoley, Worcestershire.

Death and succession
By special remainder, Savage was made heir to his father-in-law's titles, but did not live to inherit them. He died 20 November of "the running gout" at his home on Tower Hill in London and was buried 16 December 1635 in the Savage family chapel in Macclesfield, Cheshire. He was buried on the same day as his mother; only ten of his nineteen children were still living at the time of his death. His eldest son, John, succeeded him as 2nd Viscount Savage, later becoming 2nd Earl Rivers on the death of his maternal grandfather in 1640. His widow was created, on 21 April 1641, Countess Rivers for life, fourteen months after her father's death. She died 9 March 1651 and was buried at St. Osyth's, Essex.

Notes

References

External links
 Sir Thomas Savage, 1st Viscount Savage (1586-1635), Cornelius Johnson (London 1593 - Utrecht 1661) at National Trust Collections
 Success in search for Melford Hall's lost owner at National Trust

1580s births
1635 deaths
Deputy Lieutenants of Cheshire
Knights Bachelor
English courtiers
Viscounts in the Peerage of England
Court of Charles I of England
Savage family